Queenvic is a genus of Australian white tailed spiders that was first described by Norman I. Platnick in 2000.

Species
 it contains four species:
Queenvic goanna Platnick, 2000 – Australia (Queensland, New South Wales)
Queenvic kelty Platnick, 2000 – Australia (South Australia, Victoria)
Queenvic mackay Platnick, 2000 (type) – Eastern Australia
Queenvic piccadilly Platnick, 2000 – Southeastern Australia

See also
 List of Lamponidae species

References

Araneomorphae genera
Lamponidae
Spiders of Australia